Jesse Delano Ellis, II, commonly known as J. Delano Ellis, (December 11, 1944 – September 19, 2020) was an American Protestant religious leader and progenitor of unity among African American Pentecostals with Trinitarian and nontrinitarian affinities.

Establishing and initially leading the Joint College of Bishops as their metropolitan archbishop, Ellis also founded and served as presiding prelate for the United Pentecostal Churches of Christ (today the United Covenant Churches of Christ) and Pentecostal Churches of Christ. He served as the senior pastor of the Pentecostal Church of Christ in Cleveland, Ohio, beginning on May 14, 1989.

From the inception of the Joint College of Bishops, Ellis, alongside the organization's co-founders—Wilbert Sterling McKinley, Roy Edward Brown, and Paul S. Morton—have been labeled as "leaders in the shift" among African American Pentecostalism for introducing liturgical order and identity among Pentecostal or Full Gospel churches and denominations. As a promoter of ecumenism, Ellis placed Pentecostalism as manifested among African Americans in conversation with the broader Christian community around the world.

Through Ellis, many classical and Oneness Pentecostal denominations claim to derive "western and eastern streams of apostolic succession" as described in his book, The Bishopric – A Handbook on Creating Episcopacy in the African-American Pentecostal Church.

Biography

Early life 
J. Delano Ellis, II was the son of Lucy and Jesse Delano Ellis, Sr. At age 13 or 14, Lucy became pregnant with Ellis. His mother was a Christian and his father rejected Christianity for Moorish Science and then the Nation of Islam. During his childhood, his mother was placed in a mental health institution; he then lived with his grandmother and great aunt.

During his teen years, Ellis attempted to establish a relationship with his father by attending a Nation of Islam mosque. His father told them Jesus was the "white man's god and Christianity was a trick designed to enslave black people." Ellis began attending the Christian Tabernacle Church of God in Christ under the pastorate of Bishop R.T. Jones, Sr. One night at the church Ellis professed Christianity and claimed his father physically abused him for rejecting Islam (see also: apostasy in Islam).

In his early adulthood, Ellis joined the United States Air Force and attended the Church of the Nazarene. Due to racial segregation he joined the Christian Methodist Episcopal Church and developed an appreciation of high church liturgy and ecclesiology. He soon returned to the Church of God in Christ.

Ordination and consecration 
In 1963, Ellis was ordained by Bishop Ozro Thurston Jones, Sr. of the Church of God in Christ; he was elevated to the episcopacy in 1970 by Bishop Brumfield Johnson of the United Holy Church of America. In the Church of God in Christ, Ellis organized the Adjutant's Corp. He served as the third Chief Adjutant of the National Adjutancy of the Church of God in Christ.

In 1989, Ellis was asked to lead a Oneness Pentecostal congregation outside of the Church of God in Christ. He determined Oneness Pentecostalism and Trinitarianism weren't entirely different conceptions, yet rejected distinctions between the persons of the Trinity. He came to believe there was no scriptural support for the doctrine of Trinitarian Christianity. Ellis soon after founded the United Pentecostal Churches of Christ (now the United Covenant Churches of Christ).

Joint College of Bishops 
During his tenure as presiding prelate of the United Pentecostal Churches of Christ, he co-founded the Joint College of African-American Pentecostal Bishops. The Joint College of African-American Pentecostal Bishops (JCAAPB), more commonly the Joint College of Bishops (JCOB), was an ecumenical synod established by Ellis, Wilbert Sterling McKinley, Roy Edward Brown, and Paul S. Morton in November 1993.

The Joint College of Bishops originally functioned as a high church Pentecostal body, later expanding into other Protestant traditions through Doye Agama and the Apostolic Pastoral Congress. Membership of the Joint College of Bishops have been noted for reappropriating the history and meaning of vestments as upheld by their initial users in Roman Catholicism and Anglicanism. One instance of reappropriation is teaching the chimere is a prophetic garment; in contrast with instruction from the newly-established college of bishops, the chimere was originally part of academic dress before adoption by Anglican bishops. Leaders within the Joint College of Bishops have also been noted for teaching five-fold ministry and the ordination of women.

During theological disputes on Christian universalism within the Joint College, Ellis and the college denounced Carlton Pearson as a heretic for advocating universalism. Under his administration, the Joint College of Bishops also admitted and certified gay bishop O.C. Allen of the Vision Church of Atlanta in 2012, spurring further controversy within African American Pentecostalism.

Controversy, later life 
In 1995, Ellis was fired after briefly serving as a city police chaplain for his comments toward Muslims, stating Islam was "bloody and dangerous" at worst; in 2001, Ellis resigned from a local faith committee over antisemitic controversy. As late as the 21st century, Ellis also served as a member of Eureka Lodge No. 52 of the Prince Hall Freemasons. He was a grand prior and 33rd degree mason.

After 30 years of leadership at the Pentecostal Church of Christ in Cleveland, J. Delano Ellis, II abdicated his pastorate in 2019; his wife, Dr. Sabrina Ellis, was appointed the new senior pastor. 

On September 19, 2020, Ellis died, according to an announcement from his wife. His death almost immediately followed a street being named in his honor. The Potter's House Church founder Thomas Dexter Jakes preached at his funeral. Following his death, Bishop Woodson of the PCC's Mid-South Episcopal Diocese was elected as new presiding prelate for the Pentecostal Churches of Christ. The majority of the executive and advisory boards of the Joint College of Bishops also resigned. After resignation, the remainder of the college of bishops temporarily became the J.D. Ellis Training Academy, before restoring the Joint College of Bishops.

Apostolic succession
In an appendix to his book The Bishopric – A Handbook on Creating Episcopacy in the African-American Pentecostal Church, Ellis claimed both "western and eastern streams of apostolic succession" for himself and for the United Pentecostal Churches of Christ.

He claimed "western streams of succession" via the Church of England, John Wesley, Thomas Coke, Francis Asbury, the Methodist Episcopal Church and the Church of God in Christ. The claimed succession from the Methodist Episcopal Church is stated as being via three Church of God in Christ bishops (David Charles Williams, Carl Edward Williams and Reuben Timothy Jones), all of whom held "Holy Orders" from the Methodist Episcopal Church. In his book, he made no claim or comment at all as to whether the line of succession via Wesley, Coke, Asbury and the Methodist Episcopal Church carries unbroken apostolic succession as distinct from presbyteral succession only. He also didn't indicate that Williams, Williams and Jones possessed episcopal consecration from the Methodist Episcopal Church, nor does he cite any episcopal apostolic lineage for their status as bishops of the Church of God in Christ. The question as to whether there can be apostolic succession via Wesley is a moot point. Wesley was a Church of England clergyman but he was not a Church of England bishop. Some believe that Wesley was secretly consecrated bishop by Greek Orthodox bishop Erasmus of Arcadia in 1763. Others believe Wesley's stance that apostolic succession could be transmitted through presbyters, and that he was a scriptural episkopos.

Ellis also noted that in 1964 he had been ordained presbyter by Bishop Ozro Thurston Jones of the Church of God in Christ, and he notes his episcopal consecration in 1970 by Bishop Brumfield Johnson of the Mount Calvary Holy Church of America. His book cites no episcopal apostolic lineage for this 1970 consecration.

"Eastern streams of succession" are traced from the Syro-Chaldean Church in the East, via Archbishop Bertram S. Schlossberg (Mar Uzziah), Archbishop-Metropolitan of the Syro-Chaldean Church of North America, now known as the Evangelical Apostolic Church of North America. In 1995, Ellis stated, the Evangelical Apostolic Church of North America entered into collegial fellowship with the United Pentecostal Churches of Christ. At a holy convocation of the United Pentecostal Churches of Christ, Bishop Robert Woodward Burgess, II (allegedly representing Archbishop Schlossberg, who was living in Jerusalem) had allegedly assisted at the consecration of a number of additional bishops.

According to Ellis, Archbishop Schlossberg and Bishop Burgess claimed to possess lineages from bishops Prazsky (Slavonic Orthodox lineage) and Gaines (Russian and Ukrainian Orthodox lineage). They also claimed this succession converges in Schlossberg and Burgess, as well as numerous lineages deriving via Hugh George de Willmott Newman (Mar Georgius). In his book, Ellis mentions the Slavonic and Russian/Ukrainian lineages via Prazsky and Gaines, but the only one of Newman's many lineages that he cites is the Syro-Chaldean.

Claiming both "western and eastern streams of apostolic succession" for himself and the United Pentecostal Churches of Christ, and being Oneness Pentecostal, according to Michael Ramsey, once the Archbishop of Canterbury (1961–1974), the validity of someone's succession pertains to continuity of teaching, preaching, governing, ordination and grace. In Catholic theology, apostolic succession effects the power and authority to administer the sacraments except for baptism and matrimony; thus, apostolic succession is necessary for the valid celebration of the sacraments. Against the claims of Ellis and their college of bishops, Anglican and Catholic theologians historically nullify "western and eastern streams of apostolic succession" as his predecessors were Trinitarian, thereby disqualifying Delano's succession claims.

References

External links
Bishop J. Delano Ellis Celebrates 45 Years in Ministry

1944 births
2020 deaths
20th-century American bishops
21st-century American bishops
American Pentecostal pastors
Church of God in Christ pastors
Pentecostal writers
African-American Christian clergy
Religious leaders from Cleveland
Writers from Cleveland
Clergy from Philadelphia
Writers from Philadelphia
Oneness Pentecostals
American Freemasons
21st-century African-American people